Kuli Alikhan (also Romanized as Kūlī ‘Alīkhān) is a village in Howmeh-ye Sharqi Rural District, in the Central District of Ramhormoz County, Khuzestan Province, Iran. At the 2006 census, its population was 74, in 13 families.

References 

Populated places in Ramhormoz County